Molly Winifred Holden (7 September 1927 in London – 1981) was a British poet.

Biography
Holden grew up in Surrey, and Wiltshire.
She graduated from King's College London in 1951. Her maiden name was Gilbert. She was the granddaughter of the popular children's author Henry Gilbert.

She suffered from multiple sclerosis.

Awards
 1972 Cholmondeley Award

Works
 A Hill Like a Horse, 1963
 Bright Cloud, 1964
 
 
The Country Over. Chatto and Windus. 1975.
 
 'Sudden Immobility: Selected Poems of Molly Holden'. Barbarian Press. 2021. ISBN 0-920971-58-x

Memoirs

Anthologies

References

External links
 "The Poetry of Molly Holden", Roger Alma, Poetry Nation, No 2 - 1974
 
 
 

1927 births
1981 deaths
English women poets
Writers from London
Alumni of King's College London
20th-century English women writers
20th-century English poets